A Life in the Theatre is a 1979 American television film based on the play A Life in the Theatre by David Mamet.  It stars Peter Evans and Ellis Rabb, reprising their roles from the original 1977 off-Broadway production.

Plot
The story focuses on the relationship between two actors, the only characters. One, Robert, is a stage veteran while John is a young, promising actor. They are involved in a variety of productions, and gradually their relationship begins to change.

Cast
Peter Evans as John
Ellis Rabb as Robert

See also
A Life in the Theatre (1993), a second television adaptation released in 1993 and starring Matthew Broderick and Jack Lemmon.

References

External links
 

American television films
1970s English-language films
1979 television films
1979 films
Films based on works by David Mamet
Films directed by Kirk Browning